Stolas (Sail the ocean, live at sea) was an American post-hardcore band from Las Vegas, Nevada formed in 2011. The band consisted of Carlo Marquez (lead vocals, drums, bass), and Sergio Medina (guitar, backing vocals). The band was signed as the first band on Blue Swan Records in 2013, a record label launched by Will Swan of Dance Gavin Dance. They have released one EP, Losing Wings (2012) and three studio albums, Living Creatures (2013), Allomaternal (2014), and Stolas (2017). The group signed to Equal Vision Records in 2016.

Stolas are prominently known for combining progressive elements with post-hardcore music.

History

Formation and "Losing Wings" EP (2011–2012)

Guitarist and vocalist Jason Weiche and drummer Carlo Marquez grew up in Kingman, Arizona and began playing music together in middle school. They worked together on many musical endeavors, and both moved to Las Vegas, Nevada. For two years Marquez and Weiche played in a local Las Vegas band, The Akashic Record.

Guitarist Sergio Medina, and bassist RJ Reynolds attended the same performing-arts high school in Las Vegas and both participated in local music acts. They were both part of the band Elessar, and Sergio also was a part of the band, Inherit the Sky.

In 2011, the four came together as a group and co-wrote the song "Time & The Sun." By the end of the year, the four-piece began recording music under the name Stolas and had recorded their debut EP titled "Losing Wings", using an older model Dell computer. Losing Wings was released independently in 2012.

Signing to Blue Swan Records and "Living Creatures" (2012–2013)

During a break from touring with Stolas, Medina filled in as a guitarist for Hail the Sun and became the guitar technician for both Hail the Sun and Dance Gavin Dance on the Rock Yourself to Sleep tour in late 2012.   Medina showed Stolas' work to Will Swan, who signed the band with his newly created Blue Swan Records label. Stolas recorded their full-length debut album, Living Creatures, Decoy Music.<ref>Senior, Nick. " Stolas - Living Creatures ". </ref> at Pus Cavern Studio in Sacramento.  Peers of Swan and other vocalist in similar bands were featured on the album including current Dance Gavin Dance vocalist Tilian Pearson, former Dance Gavin Dance vocalists Jonny Craig, Kurt Travis (formerly of A Lot Like Birds), Corey Lockwood (also of A Lot Like Birds), and Donovan Melero of Hail the Sun.http://thenewfury.com/2013/06/18/interview-with-stolas/   The album was released on March 14, 2013. Living Creatures was favorably reviewed by the public.

"Allomaternal" and departure of Jason Weiche (2014-2015)

The band's second album, Allomaternal, was released on November 7, 2014 through Blue Swan Records. A concept album based on a story created by bassist RJ Reynolds, "Allomaternal" was considered a great follow up to the good reviews and growing fan base "Living Creatures" created for the band. After much touring with bands like Dance Gavin Dance and Letlive, the quartet became the headlining band for their "Allomaternal Tour" with support from Artifex Pereo, Eidola and Icarus the Owl.

On October 22, 2015, it was revealed that lead vocalist guitarist Jason Weiche left the band. To quote the post
, "...we wish Jason all the success in the world in future musical projects along with his promising career in graphic design. He remains a great friend to all of us, and the last four years working with him have been unforgettable." The trio have continued writing music without him, with Marquez providing lead vocals, Sergio providing more vocal duties and a new member to be announced by the end of 2015 to play drums for the band along with the new album.

Stolas (2016-2018)

On March 10, 2016, the band released their new song "Catalyst" with Carlo on vocals. The song serves as a single version as it will be remastered for the new album.

On December 7, 2016, the band announced that they had signed to Equal Vision Records. The group's self-titled third studio album was released on March 17, 2017.

On April 28, 2017, RJ Reynolds departed from the band.

On May 23, 2018 the band announced their break-up after a final run of shows with the original lineup.

The band formally announced their break-up on August 7, 2018.

Band members

 Last lineup
 Carlo Marquez - drums, lead vocals (2011–2018); bass (2017)
 Sergio Medina - lead guitar, backing vocals (2011–2018); rhythm guitar, lead vocals (2015–2018)
 Bobby Lyons - bass (2017–2018)

 Former members
 Jason Welche - rhythm guitar, lead vocals (2011–2015)
 RJ Reynolds - bass (2011–2017)

 Touring musicians
Carlos Silva - drums (2016)
Tim Brown - Guitar (2017)
Nathan Sletner - drums (2017–2018)

 Timeline

Discography
Studio albumsLiving Creatures (2013) Blue Swan RecordsAllomaternal (2014) Blue Swan RecordsStolas (2017) Equal Vision Records
EPsLosing Wings'' EP (2012) self-released

References

External links

2011 establishments in Nevada
American post-hardcore musical groups
Musical groups established in 2011
Musical groups from the Las Vegas Valley
Equal Vision Records artists